(born November 12, 1981) is a triathlete from Japan.

Tayama competed at the second Olympic triathlon at the 2004 Summer Olympics.  He placed 13th with a total time of 1:53:28.41. At the Olympic games in Beijing Tayama placed 48th in triathlon with a time of 1:56:13.68 at the 2008 Summer Olympics.

Tayama earned recognition as one of the fastest swimmers in triathlon by being the first person to complete the 2.4 mile swim at the 2005 Ironman World Championship at Kona, Hawaii.

References

1981 births
Living people
Japanese male triathletes
Olympic triathletes of Japan
Triathletes at the 2004 Summer Olympics
Triathletes at the 2008 Summer Olympics
Triathletes at the 2012 Summer Olympics
Triathletes at the 2016 Summer Olympics
Asian Games medalists in triathlon
Triathletes at the 2006 Asian Games
Triathletes at the 2014 Asian Games
Asian Games gold medalists for Japan
Asian Games silver medalists for Japan
Medalists at the 2014 Asian Games
20th-century Japanese people
21st-century Japanese people